There are approximately 338 international schools operating in the Asian country of Qatar. The following are both national and international schools in Qatar (arranged in alphabetical order). (Tertiary schools are presented in the separate list of universities and colleges in Qatar.)

A

Kindergarten

Primary

Secondary

B

Kindergarten

C

Kindergarten

Primary

D

Kindergarten

E

G

H

Kindergarten

I

Kindergarten

Primary

Secondary

J

K

Kindergarten

L

M

Kindergarten

N

Kindergarten

Secondary

P

Q

Kindergarten

R

Kindergarten

S

Kindergarten

Primary

Secondary

T

Primary

See also

 Education in Qatar
 Lists of schools

References

Schools
Schools
Qatar
Qatar
Schools